The Norwegian Actors' Equity Association is an association of Norwegian actors. Its main purpose is to improve actors' working conditions and to protect the artistic, judicial and financial interests of actors in Norway. The association was established in 1898, after an initiative from actor Sigurd Asmundsen at a birthday party in 1897, followed by a preparatory meeting in April 1898, and a constituent meeting 27 October 1898. The first chairman was Sigvard Gundersen, with Johanne Dybwad as vice chairman, and Christian Sandal as first secretary. Important issues during the early years were contractual conditions, pensions, and regulation of foreign ensembles. The association's first Honorary member was actor and later theatrical director Bjørn Bjørnson, nominated in May 1900.

The Association currently has 1250 members, of whom approximately 155 are permanently employed and 150 temporarily employed in institutional theatres.
NAEA publishes Skuespillerkatalogen – the Actors' Catalogue. As the leading national casting resource, it is used by most Norwegian TV, Film, Radio and Theatre companies.

List of leaders 
 1898–1899 Sigvard Gundersen
 1899–1901 Olav Voss
 1901–1903 Ludvig Müller
 1903–1904 Ludvig Bergh
 1904–1905 Halfdan Christensen
 1905–1907 Theodor Blich
 1907–1913 Ludvig Müller
 1913–1915 Harald Stormoen
 1915–1918 Thomas Thomassen
 1918–1920 Egil Eide
 1920–1921 Thorleif Klausen
 1921–1924 Harald Stormoen
 1924–1925 Thomas Thomassen
 1925–1928 Harald Stormoen
 1928–1932 Einar Sissener
 1932–1940 Egil Hjorth-Jenssen
 1940–1941 David Knudsen
 1941– Harald Schwenzen
 1942–1945 Einar Sissener (acting)
 1945– Harald Schwenzen
 1945– Georg Løkkeberg
 1945–1946 Øyvind Øyen (acting)
 1946–1950 Jens Gunderssen
 1951–1961 Ella Hval
 1962-1964 Gunnar Olram
 1965–1967 Ella Hval
 1967–1969 Bjarne Andersen
 1970–1974 Knut Mørch Hansson
 1974-1976 Finn Kvalem
 1977–1980 Karen Randers-Pehrson
 1980-1995 Ragnhild Nygaard
 1995-2000 Bernhard Ramstad
 2000–2011 Agnete G. Haaland
 2011–2015 Hauk Heyerdahl
 2015– Knut Alfsen

References 

Theatre in Norway
Organisations based in Oslo
Trade unions established in 1898